Justice, in its broadest sense, is the principle  that people receive that which they deserve, with the interpretation of what then constitutes "deserving" being impacted upon by numerous fields, with many differing viewpoints and perspectives, including the concepts of moral correctness based on ethics, rationality, law, religion, equity and fairness. The state will sometimes endeavor to increase justice by operating courts and enforcing their rulings.

Early theories of justice were set out by the Ancient Greek philosophers Plato in his work The Republic, and Aristotle in his Nicomachean Ethics. Advocates of divine command theory have said that justice issues from God. In the 17th century, philosophers such as John Locke said that justice derives from natural law. Social contract theory said that justice is derived from the mutual agreement of everyone. In the 19th century, utilitarian philosophers such as John Stuart Mill said that justice is based on the best outcomes for the greatest number of people.

Theories of distributive justice study what is to be distributed, between whom they are to be distributed, and what is the proper distribution. Egalitarians have said that justice can only exist within the coordinates of equality. John Rawls used a social contract theory to say that justice, and especially distributive justice, is a form of fairness. Robert Nozick and others said that property rights, also within the realm of distributive justice and natural law, maximizes the overall wealth of an economic system. Theories of retributive justice say that wrongdoing should be punished to ensure justice. The closely related restorative justice (also sometimes called "reparative justice") is an approach to justice that focuses on the needs of victims and offenders.

Harmony

Justice is a proper, harmonious relationship between the warring parts of the person or city. Hence, Plato's definition of justice is that justice is the having and doing of what is one's own. A just man is a man in just the right place, doing his best and giving the precise equivalent of what he has received. This applies both at the individual level and at the universal level. A person's soul has three parts – reason, spirit and desire. Similarly, a city has three parts – Socrates uses the parable of the chariot to illustrate his point: a chariot works as a whole because the two horses' power is directed by the charioteer. Lovers of wisdom – philosophers, in one sense of the term – should rule because only they understand what is good. If one is ill, one goes to a medic rather than a farmer, because the medic is expert in the subject of health. Similarly, one should trust one's city to an expert in the subject of the good, not to a mere politician who tries to gain power by giving people what they want, rather than what's good for them. Socrates uses the parable of the ship to illustrate this point: the unjust city is like a ship in open ocean, crewed by a powerful but drunken captain (the common people), a group of untrustworthy advisors who try to manipulate the captain into giving them power over the ship's course (the politicians), and a navigator (the philosopher) who is the only one who knows how to get the ship to port. For Socrates, the only way the ship will reach its destination – the good – is if the navigator takes charge.

Divine command

Advocates of divine command theory say that justice, and indeed the whole of morality, is the authoritative command of God. Murder is wrong and must be punished, for instance, because God says it so. Some versions of the theory assert that God must be obeyed because of the nature of his relationship with humanity, others assert that God must be obeyed because he is goodness itself, and thus doing what he says would be best for everyone.

A meditation on the divine command theory by Plato can be found in his dialogue, Euthyphro. Called the Euthyphro dilemma, it goes as follows: "Is what is morally good commanded by God because it is morally good, or is it morally good because it is commanded by God?" The implication is that if the latter is true, then justice is beyond mortal understanding; if the former is true, then morality exists independently from God, and is therefore subject to the judgment of mortals. A response, popularized in two contexts by Immanuel Kant and C. S. Lewis, is that it is deductively valid to say that the existence of an objective morality implies the existence of God and vice versa.

Natural law

For advocates of the theory that justice is part of natural law (e.g., John Locke), justice involves the nature of man.

Despotism and skepticism

In Republic by Plato, the character Thrasymachus argues that justice is the interest of the strong – merely a name for what the powerful or cunning ruler has imposed on the people.

Mutual agreement

Advocates of the social contract say that justice is derived from the mutual agreement of everyone; or, in many versions, from what they would agree to under hypothetical conditions including equality and absence of bias. This account is considered further below, under 'Justice as Fairness'. The absence of bias refers to an equal ground for all people involved in a disagreement (or trial in some cases).

Subordinate value
According to utilitarian thinkers including John Stuart Mill, justice is not as fundamental as we often think. Rather, it is derived from the more basic standard of rightness, consequentialism: what is right is what has the best consequences (usually measured by the total or average welfare caused). So, the proper principles of justice are those that tend to have the best consequences. These rules may turn out to be familiar ones such as keeping contracts; but equally, they may not, depending on the facts about real consequences. Either way, what is important is those consequences, and justice is important, if at all, only as derived from that fundamental standard. Mill tries to explain our mistaken belief that justice is overwhelmingly important by arguing that it derives from two natural human tendencies: our desire to retaliate against those who hurt us, or the feeling of self-defense and our ability to put ourselves imaginatively in another's place, sympathy. So, when we see someone harmed, we project ourselves into their situation and feel a desire to retaliate on their behalf. If this process is the source of our feelings about justice, that ought to undermine our confidence in them.

Theories of retributive justice

Theories of retributive justice involve punishment for wrongdoing, and need to answer three questions:
 why punish?
 who should be punished?
 what punishment should they receive?
This section considers the two major accounts of retributive justice, and their answers to these questions. Utilitarian theories look forward to the future consequences of punishment, while retributive theories look back to particular acts of wrongdoing, and attempt to balance them with deserved punishment.

Utilitarianism
According to the utilitarian, justice requires the maximization of the total or average welfare across all relevant individuals. Punishment fights crime in three ways:
 Deterrence. The credible threat of punishment might lead people to make different choices; well-designed threats might lead people to make choices that maximize welfare. This matches some strong intuitions about just punishment: that it should generally be proportional to the crime.
 Rehabilitation. Punishment might make "bad people" into "better" ones. For the utilitarian, all that "bad person" can mean is "person who's likely to cause unwanted things (like suffering)". So, utilitarianism could recommend punishment that changes someone such that they are less likely to cause bad things.
 Security/Incapacitation. Perhaps there are people who are irredeemable causers of bad things. If so, imprisoning them might maximize welfare by limiting their opportunities to cause harm and therefore the benefit lies within protecting society.
So, the reason for punishment is the maximization of welfare, and punishment should be of whomever, and of whatever form and severity, are needed to meet that goal. This may sometimes justify punishing the innocent, or inflicting disproportionately severe punishments, when that will have the best consequences overall (perhaps executing a few suspected shoplifters live on television would be an effective deterrent to shoplifting, for instance). It also suggests that punishment might turn out never to be right, depending on the facts about what actual consequences it has.

Retributivism
The retributivist will think consequentialism is mistaken. If someone does something wrong we must respond by punishing for the committed action itself, regardless of what outcomes punishment produces. Wrongdoing must be balanced or made good in some way, and so the criminal deserves to be punished. It says that all guilty people, and only guilty people, deserve appropriate punishment. This matches some strong intuitions about just punishment: that it should be proportional to the crime, and that it should be of only and all of the guilty. However, it is sometimes said that retributivism is merely revenge in disguise. However, there are differences between retribution and revenge: the former is impartial and has a scale of appropriateness, whereas the latter is personal and potentially unlimited in scale.

Restorative justice

Restorative justice (also sometimes called "reparative justice") is an approach to justice that focuses on the needs of victims and offenders, instead of satisfying abstract legal principles or punishing the offender. Victims take an active role in the process, while offenders are encouraged to take responsibility for their actions, "to repair the harm they've done – by apologizing, returning stolen money, or community service". It is based on a theory of justice that considers crime and wrongdoing to be an offense against an individual or community rather than the state. Restorative justice that fosters dialogue between victim and offender shows the highest rates of victim satisfaction and offender accountability.

Mixed theories
Some modern philosophers have said that Utilitarian and Retributive theories are not mutually exclusive. For example, Andrew von Hirsch, in his 1976 book Doing Justice, suggested that we have a moral obligation to punish greater crimes more than lesser ones. However, so long as we adhere to that constraint then utilitarian ideals would play a significant secondary role.

Theories

Introduction

It has been said that 'systematic' or 'programmatic' political and moral philosophy in the West begins, in Plato's Republic, with the question, 'What is Justice?' According to most contemporary theories of justice, justice is overwhelmingly important: John Rawls claims that "Justice is the first virtue of social institutions, as truth is of systems of thought." In classical approaches, evident from Plato through to Rawls, the concept of 'justice' is always construed in logical or 'etymological' opposition to the concept of injustice. Such approaches cite various examples of injustice, as problems which a theory of justice must overcome.  A number of post-World War II approaches do, however, challenge that seemingly obvious dualism between those two concepts. Justice can be thought of as distinct from benevolence, charity, prudence, mercy, generosity, or compassion, although these dimensions are regularly understood to also be interlinked. Justice is the concept of cardinal virtues, of which it is one.  Metaphysical justice has often been associated with concepts of fate, reincarnation or Divine Providence, i.e., with a life in accordance with a cosmic plan.

The equivalence of justice and fairness has been historically and culturally established.

Equality before the law
Law raises important and complex issues about equality, fairness, and justice. There is an old saying that 'All are equal before the law'. The belief in equality before the law is called legal egalitarianism. In criticism of this belief, the author Anatole France said in 1894, "In its majestic equality, the law forbids rich and poor alike to sleep under bridges, beg in the streets, and steal loaves of bread." With this saying, France illustrated the fundamental shortcoming of a theory of legal equality that remains blind to social inequality; the same law applied to all may have disproportionately harmful effects on the least powerful.

Relational justice
Relational justice seeks to examine the connections between individuals and focuses on their relations in societies, with respect to how these relationships are established and configured. In a normative view, this focus includes an understanding of what these relations should be. In a political view, this focus includes the method of organizing persons in society. Rawls’ theory of justice stakes out the task of justice as equalizing the distribution of primary social goods to benefit the worst-off in society. However, his distributive scheme, and other distributive accounts of justice do not directly consider power relations between and among individuals. Nor do they address such political considerations as various structures of decision-making, such as divisions of labor culture, or the construction of social meanings. Even Rawls’ own basic value of self-respect cannot be said to be amenable to distribution. Iris Marion Young charges that distributive accounts of justice fail to provide an adequate way of conceptualizing political justice in that they fail to take into account many of the demands of ordinary life and that a relational view of justice grounded upon understanding the differences among social groups offers a better approach, one which acknowledges unjust power relations among individuals, groups, and institutional structures. Young Kim also takes a relational approach to the question of justice, but departs from Iris Marion Young's political advocacy of group rights and instead, he emphasizes the individual and moral aspects of justice. As to its moral aspects, he said that justice includes responsible actions based on rational and autonomous moral agency, with the individual as the proper bearer of rights and responsibilities. Politically, he maintains that the proper context for justice is a form of liberalism with the traditional elements of liberty and equality, together with the concepts of diversity and tolerance.

Classical liberalism
Equality before the law is one of the basic principles of classical liberalism. Classical liberalism calls for equality before the law, not for equality of outcome. Classical liberalism opposes pursuing group rights at the expense of individual rights. In addition to equality, individual liberty serves as a core notion of classical liberalism. As to the liberty component, British social and political theorist, philosopher, and historian of ideas Isaiah Berlin identifies positive and negative liberty in "Two Concepts of Liberty", subscribing to a view of negative liberty, in the form of freedom from governmental interference. He further extends the concept of negative liberty in endorsing John Stuart Mills' harm principle: "the sole end for which mankind are warranted, individually and collectively, in interfering with the liberty of action of any of their number, is self-protection", which represents a classical liberal view of liberty.

Equality
In political theory, liberalism includes two traditional elements: liberty and equality. Most contemporary theories of justice emphasize the concept of equality, including Rawls' theory of justice as fairness. For Ronald Dworkin, a complex notion of equality is the sovereign political virtue. Dworkin raises the question of whether society is under a duty of justice to help those responsible for the fact that they need help. Complications arise in distinguishing matters of choice and matters of chance, as well as justice for future generations in the redistribution of resources that he advocates.

Religion and spirituality

Abrahamic justice

Jews, Christians, and Muslims traditionally believe that justice is a present, real, right, and, specifically, governing concept along with mercy, and that justice is ultimately derived from and held by God. According to the Bible, such institutions as the Mosaic Law were created by God to require the Israelites to live by and apply His standards of justice.

The Hebrew Bible describes God as saying about the Judeo-Christian patriarch Abraham: "No, for I have chosen him, that he may charge his children and his household after him to keep the way of the Lord by doing righteousness and justice;...." (Genesis 18:19, NRSV). The Psalmist describes God as having "Righteousness and justice [as] the foundation of [His] throne;...." (Psalms 89:14, NRSV).

The New Testament also describes God and Jesus Christ as having and displaying justice, often in comparison with God displaying and supporting mercy (Matthew 5:7).

Theories of sentencing
In criminal law, a sentence forms the final explicit act of a judge-ruled process, and also the symbolic principal act connected to his function. The sentence can generally involve a decree of imprisonment, a fine and/or other punishments against a defendant convicted of a crime. Laws may specify the range of penalties that can be imposed for various offenses, and sentencing guidelines sometimes regulate what punishment within those ranges can be imposed given a certain set of offense and offender characteristics. The most common purposes of sentencing in legal theory are:

In civil cases the decision is usually known as a verdict, or judgment, rather than a sentence. Civil cases are settled primarily by means of monetary compensation for harm done ("damages") and orders intended to prevent future harm (for example injunctions). Under some legal systems an award of damages involves some scope for retribution, denunciation and deterrence, by means of additional categories of damages beyond simple compensation, covering a punitive effect, social disapprobation, and potentially, deterrence, and occasionally disgorgement (forfeit of any gain, even if no loss was caused to the other party).

Evolutionary perspectives
Evolutionary ethics and evolution of morality suggest evolutionary bases for the concept of justice. Biosocial criminology research says that human perceptions of what is appropriate criminal justice are based on how to respond to crimes in the ancestral small-group environment and that these responses may not always be appropriate for today's societies.

Reactions to fairness
Studies at UCLA in 2008 have indicated that reactions to fairness are "wired" into the brain and that, "Fairness is activating the same part of the brain that responds to food in rats... This is consistent with the notion that being treated fairly satisfies a basic need". Research conducted in 2003 at Emory University involving capuchin monkeys demonstrated that other cooperative animals also possess such a sense and that "inequity aversion may not be uniquely human".

Institutions and justice

In a world where people are interconnected but they disagree, institutions are required to instantiate ideals of justice. These institutions may be justified by their approximate instantiation of justice, or they may be deeply unjust when compared with ideal standards – consider the institution of slavery. Justice is an ideal the world fails to live up to, sometimes due to deliberate opposition to justice despite understanding, which could be disastrous. The question of institutive justice raises issues of legitimacy, procedure, codification and interpretation, which are considered by legal theorists and by philosophers of law. The United Nations Sustainable Development Goal 16 emphasizes the need for strong institutions in order to uphold justice.

Psychology 

There has been research into victim's persepctive of justice following crimes. Victims find respectful treatment, information and having a voice important for a sense of justice as well as the perception of a fair procedure. 

Pemberton et al propose a "Big 2" model of justice in terms agency and communion, membership in a society. Victims experience a loss of perception of agency due to a loss of control as well as a loss of communion if the offender is a member of their social group, but may also lose trust in others or institutions. It can shatter an individuals trust that they live in a just and moral world. This suggests that a sense of justice can be restored by increasing a sense of communion and agency rather than through retribution of restoration.

Theories of distributive justice

Theories of distributive justice need to answer three questions:
 What goods are to be distributed? Is it to be wealth, power, respect, opportunities or some combination of these things?
 Between what entities are they to be distributed? Humans (dead, living, future), sentient beings, the members of a single society, nations?
 What is the proper distribution? Equal, meritocratic, according to social status, according to need, based on property rights and non-aggression?

Distributive justice theorists generally do not answer questions of who has the right to enforce a particular favored distribution, while property rights theorists say that there is no "favored distribution". Rather, distribution should be based simply on whatever distribution results from lawful interactions or transactions (that is, transactions which are not illicit).

Social justice

Social justice encompasses the just relationship between individuals and their society, often considering how privileges, opportunities, and wealth ought to be distributed among individuals. Social justice is also associated with social mobility, especially the ease with which individuals and families may move between social strata. Social justice is distinct from cosmopolitanism, which is the idea that all people belong to a single global community with a shared morality. Social justice is also distinct from egalitarianism, which is the idea that all people are equal in terms of status, value, or rights, as social justice theories do not all require equality. For example, sociologist George C. Homans suggested that the root of the concept of justice is that each person should receive rewards that are proportional to their contributions. Economist Friedrich Hayek said that the concept of social justice was meaningless, saying that justice is a result of individual behavior and unpredictable market forces. Social justice is closely related to the concept of relational justice, which is about the just relationship with individuals who possess features in common such as nationality, or who are engaged in cooperation or negotiation.

Fairness

In his A Theory of Justice, John Rawls used a social contract argument to show that justice, and especially distributive justice, is a form of fairness: an impartial distribution of goods. Rawls asks us to imagine ourselves behind a veil of ignorance that denies us all knowledge of our personalities, social statuses, moral characters, wealth, talents and life plans, and then asks what theory of justice we would choose to govern our society when the veil is lifted, if we wanted to do the best that we could for ourselves. We don't know who in particular we are, and therefore can't bias the decision in our own favor. So, the decision-in-ignorance models fairness, because it excludes selfish bias. Rawls said that each of us would reject the utilitarian theory of justice that we should maximize welfare (see below) because of the risk that we might turn out to be someone whose own good is sacrificed for greater benefits for others. Instead, we would endorse Rawls's two principles of justice:
 Each person is to have an equal right to the most extensive total system of equal basic liberties compatible with a similar system of liberty for all.
 Social and economic inequalities are to be arranged so that they are both
 to the greatest benefit of the least advantaged, consistent with the just savings principle, and
 attached to offices and positions open to all under conditions of fair equality of opportunity.

This imagined choice justifies these principles as the principles of justice for us, because we would agree to them in a fair decision procedure. Rawls's theory distinguishes two kinds of goods – (1) the good of liberty rights and (2) social and economic goods, i.e. wealth, income and power – and applies different distributions to them – equality between citizens for (1), equality unless inequality improves the position of the worst off for (2).

In one sense, theories of distributive justice may assert that everyone should get what they deserve. Theories vary on the meaning of what is "deserved". The main distinction is between theories that say the basis of just deserts ought to be held equally by everyone, and therefore derive egalitarian accounts of distributive justice – and theories that say the basis of just deserts is unequally distributed on the basis of, for instance, hard work, and therefore derive accounts of distributive justice by which some should have more than others.

According to meritocratic theories, goods, especially wealth and social status, should be distributed to match individual merit, which is usually understood as some combination of talent and hard work. According to needs-based theories, goods, especially such basic goods as food, shelter and medical care, should be distributed to meet individuals' basic needs for them. Marxism is a needs-based theory, expressed succinctly in Marx's slogan "from each according to his ability, to each according to his need". According to contribution-based theories, goods should be distributed to match an individual's contribution to the overall social good.

Property rights

In Anarchy, State, and Utopia, Robert Nozick said that distributive justice is not a matter of the whole distribution matching an ideal pattern, but of each individual entitlement having the right kind of history. It is just that a person has some good (especially, some property right) if and only if they came to have it by a history made up entirely of events of two kinds:
 Just acquisition, especially by working on unowned things; and
 Just transfer, that is free gift, sale or other agreement, but not theft (i.e. by force or fraud).

If the chain of events leading up to the person having something meets this criterion, they are entitled to it: that they possess it is just, and what anyone else does or doesn't have or need is irrelevant.

On the basis of this theory of distributive justice, Nozick said that all attempts to redistribute goods according to an ideal pattern, without the consent of their owners, are theft. In particular, redistributive taxation is theft.

Some property rights theorists (such as Nozick) also take a consequentialist view of distributive justice and say that property rights based justice also has the effect of maximizing the overall wealth of an economic system.  They explain that voluntary (non-coerced) transactions always have a property called Pareto efficiency. The result is that the world is better off in an absolute sense and no one is worse off.  They say that respecting property rights maximizes the number of Pareto efficient transactions in the world and minimized the number of non-Pareto efficient transactions in the world (i.e. transactions where someone is made worse off).  The result is that the world will have generated the greatest total benefit from the limited, scarce resources available in the world.  Further, this will have been accomplished without taking anything away from anyone unlawfully.

Welfare-maximization

According to the utilitarian, justice requires the maximization of the total or average welfare across all relevant individuals. This may require sacrifice of some for the good of others, so long as everyone's good is taken impartially into account. Utilitarianism, in general, says that the standard of justification for actions, institutions, or the whole world, is impartial welfare consequentialism, and only indirectly, if at all, to do with rights, property, need, or any other non-utilitarian criterion. These other criteria might be indirectly important, to the extent that human welfare involves them. But even then, such demands as human rights would only be elements in the calculation of overall welfare, not uncrossable barriers to action.

See also

Other pages

 Education for Justice

 Adl (Arabic for Justice in Islam)
 Criminal justice
 Ethics
 Global justice
 International Court of Justice
 International Criminal Court
 Just war theory
 Just-world hypothesis
 Justice (economics)
 Morality
 Napoleonic Code
 Rationality
 Rule according to higher law
 Sociology of law
 A Theory of Justice by John Rawls

Types of justice

 Distributive justice
 Environmental justice
 Injustice
 Occupational injustice
 Open justice
 Organizational justice
 Poetic justice
 Social justice
 Spatial justice

References

Further reading
 Clive Barnett, The Priority of Injustice: Locating Democracy in Critical Theory (Athens, GA: University of Georgia Press, 2017), 
 Brian Barry, Theories of Justice (Berkeley: University of California Press, 1989)
 Gad Barzilai, Communities and Law: Politics and Cultures of Legal Identities (Ann Arbor: University of Michigan Press, 2003)
 Harry Brighouse, Justice (Cambridge: Polity Press, 2004)
 Anthony Duff & David Garland eds, A Reader on Punishment (Oxford: Oxford University Press, 1994)
 Colin Farrelly, An Introduction to Contemporary Political Theory (London: Sage, 2004)
 David Gauthier, Morals By Agreement (Oxford: Clarendon Press, 1986)
 Robert E. Goodin & Philip Pettit eds, Contemporary Political Philosophy: An anthology (2nd edition, Malden, Massachusetts: Blackwell, 2006), Part III
 Serge Guinchard, La justice et ses institutions (Judicial institutions), Dalloz editor, 12 edition, 2013
 Eric Heinze, The Concept of Injustice (Routledge, 2013)
 Ted Honderich, Punishment: The supposed justifications (London: Hutchinson & Co., 1969)
 James Konow (2003) "Which Is the Fairest One of All? A Positive Analysis of Justice Theories", Journal of Economic Literature, 41(4)pp. 1188–1239
 Will Kymlicka, Contemporary Political Philosophy: An introduction (2nd edition, Oxford: Oxford University Press, 2002)
 Nicola Lacey, State Punishment (London: Routledge, 1988)
 John Stuart Mill, Utilitarianism in On Liberty and Other Essays ed. John Gray (Oxford: Oxford University Press, 1991)
 Robert Nozick, Anarchy, State, and Utopia (Oxford: Blackwell, 1974)
 
 Marek Piechowiak, Plato's Conception of Justice and the Question of Human Dignity (2nd edition, revised and extended, Berlin: Peter Lang Academic Publishers, 2021), ISBN 978-3-631-84524-0.
 C.L. Ten, Crime, Guilt, and Punishment: A philosophical introduction (Oxford: Clarendon Press, 1987)
 Plato, Republic trans. Robin Waterfield (Oxford: Oxford University Press, 1994)
 John Rawls, A Theory of Justice (revised edition, Oxford: Oxford University Press, 1999)
 David Schmidtz, Elements of Justice (New York: Columbia University Press, 2006)
 Peter Singer ed., A Companion to Ethics (Oxford: Blackwell, 1993), Part IV
 Reinhold Zippelius, Rechtsphilosophie, §§ 11–22 (6th edition, Munich: C.H. Beck, 2011),

External links

 Internet Encyclopedia of Philosophy entries:
 Distributive Justice, by Michael Allingham
 Punishment, by Kevin Murtagh
 Western Theories of Justice, by Wayne P. Pomerleau
 Stanford Encyclopedia of Philosophy entries:
 "Justice" by David Miller
 "Distributive Justice" by Julian Lamont
 "Justice as a Virtue" by Michael Slote
 "Punishment" by Hugo Adam Bedau and Erin Kelly
 United Nations Rule of Law: Informal Justice, on the relationship between informal/community justice, the rule of law and the United Nations
 Justice: What's The Right Thing To Do? , a series of 12 videos on the subject of justice by Harvard University's Michael Sandel, with reading materials and comments from participants.

 
Ethical principles
Philosophy of law
Virtue